WXOB-LP (channel 17) was a low-power, religious independent television station in Richmond, Virginia. The station was owned by KM Broadcasting of Annandale, Virginia, no relation to KM Communications.

History
Founded on August 30, 1990, the station was launched as W14BN. In 1998, the call signs were changed to WBOX-LP as the station affiliated with The Box. MTV purchased the network and subsumed it into MTV2 at the start of 2001. Originally broadcast on local channel 14, the station switched to channel 17 in 2002, after it was acquired by KM Broadcasting, departing from MTV2. Once KM's takeover was complete, the call signs were reversed from WBOX-LP to WXOB-LP. The station began to offer religious shows from around the Richmond area, as well as several surrounding cities. It also held a short-lived affiliation with the Trinity Broadcasting Network.

The station never filed to transfer to digital operation, and continued to broadcast in analog until the low-power digital transition date of July 13, 2021, when it went dark. The station's license was cancelled July 8, 2022, due to failing to file for a license for digital operation prior to the expiration of its construction permit.

Programming
WXOB-LP broadcast local and neighborhood church services originating from Richmond and the adjacent Hampton Roads region. The television evangelists featured were exclusively Protestant and from black churches, along with leased-time programs from national ministries, including Amazing Facts, Joyce Meyer and Shepherd's Chapel. It also aired some programming from WHRO-TV to fulfill any educational programming obligations it had.

References

External links
VARTV Richmond Homepage

Religious television stations in the United States
XOB-LP
Annandale, Virginia
Television channels and stations established in 1997
1997 establishments in Virginia
Defunct television stations in the United States
Television channels and stations disestablished in 2022
2022 disestablishments in Virginia